Calmodulin-binding transcription activator 1 is a protein that in humans is encoded by the CAMTA1 gene.

References

Further reading